Croydon East was a borough constituency represented in the House of Commons of the Parliament of the United Kingdom. It elected one Member of Parliament (MP) by the first past the post system of election.

Politics and history 
Croydon East was a short-lived seat for the 1950 general election, creating three seats in the County Borough of Croydon from the previous two, taking in areas from the East Surrey constituency to the south.
Croydon East took in areas of the former Croydon North and Croydon South constituencies, and East Surrey. It bordered Croydon West, Croydon North and East Surrey, and, when created, Beckenham.

All three Croydon constituencies were abolished at the 1955 general election, re-creating Croydon South and creating Croydon North East and Croydon North West seats.

For all of its history Croydon East had Conservative Members of Parliament. It saw three elections: the 1950 general election, the 1951 general election and a 1954 by-election. Prior to 1950, Croydon South had been held by Labour but most of its voters were re-drawn into Croydon West.

Boundaries 
The County Borough of Croydon wards of Addington, Addiscombe, East, South Norwood, and Woodside.

Members of Parliament

Election results

References

Politics of the London Borough of Croydon
History of the London Borough of Croydon
Parliamentary constituencies in London (historic)
Constituencies of the Parliament of the United Kingdom established in 1950
Constituencies of the Parliament of the United Kingdom disestablished in 1955